John Bird is a Canadian former rally racer. Teamed up with Bruce Simpson, they entered a combined total of 140 rallies, winning 102 of them. John was inducted into the Canadian Motorsport Hall of Fame in 2006.

References

Canadian rally drivers
Living people
Year of birth missing (living people)
Place of birth missing (living people)